Windfall in Athens is a 1954 Greek comedy film directed by Michael Cacoyannis. It was entered into the 1954 Cannes Film Festival.

Plot
Mina, a beautiful, care-free salesgirl for a milliner's shop, is robbed by two urchins while she is enjoying a Sunday morning swim. The lottery ticket she had in her purse ends up being bought by a charming, penniless young musician, and eventually wins the lottery. The two engage in a legal battle for the lottery money, but end up falling in love.

Cast
 Ellie Lambeti as Mina Labrinou
 Dimitris Horn as Alexis Lorentzatos
 Giorgos Pappas as Pavlos Karayannis
 Tasso Kavadia as Liza Karayanni
 Margarita Papageorgiou as Irini Labrinou
 Sapfo Notara as Miss Ketty
 Theano Ioannidou
 Hrysoula Pateraki as Mrs. Labrinou
 Kiki Persi
 Thanasis Veggos

References

External links

1954 films
1950s Greek-language films
1954 comedy films
Greek black-and-white films
Films directed by Michael Cacoyannis
Greek comedy films